The Alaska Defense Command (ADC) was a military formation of the United States Army. It was established on 4 February 1941, responsible for coordinating the defense of the Alaska Territory of the United States. The first commanding general of ADC was Brigadier General Simon Bolivar Buckner, Jr. The Air Force, Alaska Defense Command, was replaced by the Alaskan Air Force which was activated on 15 January 1942.

Until 1 November 1943, Alaska Defense Command was under the jurisdiction of the Western Defense Command, headquartered at the Presidio of San Francisco. ADC was dissolved on 31 October 1943 and replaced by the Alaskan Department, still commanded by now Lieutenant General Buckner but now reporting directly back to the War Department in Washington, D.C.

The Alaskan Department became United States Army Alaska on 15 December 1947.

Organization 

Organization of the command in 1941 (just before Pearl Harbor) was as follows:

 Alaska Defense Command, Fort Richardson 
 United States Army Finance Office, Anchorage
 Alaskan Defense Command Signals Detachment, Chilkoot Barracks
 B Company, 194th Tank Battalion
 4th Infantry Regiment (1 company at Ladd Field)
 37th Infantry Regiment, Fort Greely (1 Battalion at Fort Mears and 1 Company at Fort Raymond
 153rd Infantry Regiment, Fort Raymond (1 Company at Annette Island Airport, 1 Company in Nome, 1 Company at Yakutat Air Base
 201st Infantry Regiment, Fort Greely (1 Battalion at Fort Ray)
 1st Battalion, 297th Infantry Regiment, (A and B Companies at Chilkoot Barracks)
 81st Medium Field Artillery Regiment
 98th Field Artillery Regiment, Fort Greely
 250th Coast Artillery (Mobile), Fort Mears (two companies at Fort Raymond and one battalion at Fort Richardson)
 United States Army Junior Mine Planter, Chilkoot Barracks
 75th Coast Artillery Regiment (Antiaircraft)
 215th Coast Artillery Regiment (Antiaircraft), Fort Greely
 1st Battalion, 205th Coast Artillery Regiment (Antiaircraft)
 1st Battalion, 206th Coast Artillery Regiment (Antiaircraft)
 1st Battalion, 151st Engineer Regiment (Combat), Fort Greely (1 Batteries at Fort Mears, 2 Companies at Fort Raymond, 1 Platoon at Ladd Field)
 32nd Engineer Company
 Company from the 23rd Quartermasters Regiment (Truck)
 Alaskan Defense Command Quartermaster Depot, Chilkoot Barracks
 4th Ordnance Company (Medium Maintenance)
 A Company, 69th Quartermaster Battalion (Light Maintenance), Fort Greely (Detachment at Fort Richardson)
 x7 Station Complements at each fort
 Air Force, Alaska Defense Command, Elmendorf Field under lieutenant colonel E S Davis
 Alaskan Air Warning Signals Company, Fort Richardson
 408th Aviation Signal Company
 430th Aviation Maintenance Signal Company
 14th Aviation Service Signal Company (Split between each base)
 802nd Aviation Engineer Battalion, Annette Island Landing Field
 807th Aviation Engineer Company, Yakutat Air Base
 10th Aviation Service Maintenance Company (Split between each base)
28th Composite Group
 Headquarters and Headquarters Squadron, Elmendorf Field under Major N D Sillin
 18th Fighter Squadron
 73rd Medium Bomber Squadron
 36th Heavy Bomber Squadron
 Tow Target Flight
 699th Aviation Composite Ordnance Maintenance Company (Elements at Ladd Field)
 Air Corps Cold Weather Detachment, Ladd Field
 Air Corps Cold Weather Headquarters Flight
 Air Corps Heavy Bombardment Flight
 Air Corps Medium Bombardment Flight
 Air Corps Pursuit Flight

See also 

Western Defense Command
Eastern Defense Command
Central Defense Command
Southern Defense Command
Caribbean Defense Command

References

Further reading 

Regional commands of the United States Army
Military units and formations established in 1941
Military units and formations disestablished in 1943
1941 establishments in Alaska
1943 disestablishments in Alaska